Rolando Perez is an American mixed martial artist who currently competes in Bellator's bantamweight division. He has also formerly competed for World Extreme Cagefighting and Strikeforce.

Mixed martial arts career

Early career
Perez started his professional career in 2005. He fought mainly for California–based promotion Total Combat.

In 2009, after amassing a record of four victories, one loss and one draw, Perez signed with World Extreme Cagefighting.

World Extreme Cagefighting
Perez made his promotional debut on January 25, 2009, at WEC 38 against future UFC's featherweight champion José Aldo. Perez was knocked out at 4:15 in the first round.

Perez next faced Seth Dikun on June 7, 2009, at WEC 41. He lost via submission due to a triangle choke in the first round.

Strikeforce
Perez faced Edgar Cardenas on April 9, 2011, at Strikeforce: Diaz vs. Daley. He won via unanimous decision (30–27, 30–27, 30–27).

Bellator MMA
Perez made his promotional debut against Mark Vorgeas on November 15, 2014, at Bellator 131. The bout ended in a split draw (29–27 Perez, 30–26 Vorgeas, 28–28).

Perez faced Shawn Bunch at Bellator 137 on May 15, 2015. He lost the fight by unanimous decision.

Mixed martial arts record

|-
| Loss
| align=center | 7–5–2
| Shawn Bunch
| Decision (unanimous)
| Bellator 137
| 
| align=center | 3
| align=center | 5:00
| Temecula, California, United States
|
|-
| Draw
| align=center | 7–4–2
| Mark Vorgeas
| Draw (split)
| Bellator 131
| 
| align=center | 3
| align=center | 5:00
| San Diego, California, United States
|
|-
| Win
| align=center | 7–4–1
| Tony Reyes
| Decision (unanimous)
| Pacific Xtreme Combat 24
| 
| align=center | 3
| align=center | 5:00
| Manila, Philippines
|
|-
| Win
| align=center | 6–4–1
| Edgar Cardenas
| Decision (unanimous)
| Strikeforce: Diaz vs. Daley
| 
| align=center | 3
| align=center | 5:00
| San Diego, California, United States
| 
|-
| Win
| align=center | 5–4–1
| Todd Willingham
| Decision (split)
| Gladiator Challenge: Bad Behavior
| 
| align=center | 3
| align=center | 3:00
| San Jacinto, California, United States
|
|-
| Loss
| align=center | 4–4–1
| Adam Lorenz
| Decision (unanimous)
| AMMA 1: First Blood
| 
| align=center | 3
| align=center | 5:00
| Edmonton, Alberta, Canada
|
|-
| Loss
| align=center | 4–3–1
| Seth Dikun
| Submission (flying triangle choke)
| WEC 41: Brown vs. Faber 2
| 
| align=center | 1
| align=center | 2:30
| Sacramento, California, United States
| 
|-
| Loss
| align=center | 4–2–1
| José Aldo
| KO (knee and punches)
| WEC 38: Varner vs. Cerrone
| 
| align=center | 1
| align=center | 4:15
| San Diego, California, United States
|
|-
| Win
| align=center | 4–1–1
| Nick Alvarado
| TKO (corner stoppage)
| Total Combat 32
| 
| align=center | 1
| align=center | 5:00
| El Cajon, California, United States
|
|-
| Draw
| align=center | 3–1–1
| Joshric Fenwick
| Draw
| Total Combat 28
| 
| align=center | 3
| align=center | 5:00
| San Diego, California, United States
|
|-
| Win
| align=center | 3–1
| Kenneth Mendoza
| Submission (verbal)
| Total Combat 27
| 
| align=center | 1
| align=center | N/A
| Yuma, Arizona, United States
|
|-
| Win
| align=center | 2–1
| Jamie Fisher
| Submission (rear-naked choke)
| Total Combat 17: Proving Ground
| 
| align=center | 1
| align=center | N/A
| Yuma, Arizona, United States
|
|-
| Loss
| align=center | 1–1
| Angelo Catsouras
| Decision (unanimous)
| Total Combat 13: Anarchy
| 
| align=center | 3
| align=center | 3:00
| Del Mar, California, United States
|
|-
| Win
| align=center | 1–0
| Raymond Gomez
| Submission (rear-naked choke)
| Total Combat 9
| 
| align=center | 1
| align=center | N/A
| Tijuana, Baja California, Mexico
|

Professional boxing record
{| class="wikitable" style="text-align:center;"
| style="text-align:center;" colspan="8" | 1 Win (1 knockout), 1 Loss (1 knockout)
|-
| align=center style="border-style: none none solid solid; background: #e3e3e3" | Res.
| align=center style="border-style: none none solid solid; background: #e3e3e3" | Record
| align=center style="border-style: none none solid solid; background: #e3e3e3" | Opponent
| align=center style="border-style: none none solid solid; background: #e3e3e3" | Type
| align=center style="border-style: none none solid solid; background: #e3e3e3" | Rd., Time
| align=center style="border-style: none none solid solid; background: #e3e3e3" | Date
| align=center style="border-style: none none solid solid; background: #e3e3e3" | Location
| align=center style="border-style: none none solid solid; background: #e3e3e3" | Notes
|- align=center
| Loss
| align=center | 1–1 || align=left |  Julio Nario
| TKO
| 2 (4), 2:13
| 2013-03-29
| align=left |  Auditorio Municipal, Tijuana, Baja California, Mexico
| align=left | 
|- align=center
| Win
| align=center | 1–0 || align=left |  Federico Martinez
| TKO
| 2 (4)
| 2010-12-17
| align=left |  Four Points Sheraton Hotel, San Diego, California, United States
| align=left | 
|- align=center

References

1980s births
Living people
Sportspeople from San Diego
American male mixed martial artists
Mixed martial artists from California
Bantamweight mixed martial artists
Mixed martial artists utilizing boxing
Mixed martial artists utilizing Brazilian jiu-jitsu
American male boxers
American practitioners of Brazilian jiu-jitsu
Boxers from California